Daniel Duane Tompkins Farnsworth (December 23, 1819 – December 5, 1892) was an American politician in the U.S. state of West Virginia, who served in the West Virginia Senate and briefly as the second Governor of West Virginia.

Biography
Farnsworth was born in Staten Island, New York.  When he was two, his family relocated to Buckhannon, West Virginia in Upshur County.  He married Mary Ireland.  Farnsworth was the President of the West Virginia Senate in 1869 when Governor Arthur I. Boreman vacated his office to serve in the United States Senate.  Farnsworth then served as Governor of West Virginia for seven days, from February 26, 1869 - March 4, 1869.

References

External links
Daniel Duane Tompkins Farnsworth

Republican Party governors of West Virginia
Presidents of the West Virginia State Senate
Republican Party West Virginia state senators
People from Buckhannon, West Virginia
1819 births
1892 deaths
People from Staten Island
Delegates of the 1861 Wheeling Convention
19th-century American politicians